R (Secretary of State for the Home Department) v Immigration Appeal Tribunal and Surinder Singh [1992] 3 CMLR 358 is a UK immigration law and EU law case involving the right of entry and residence into a nation state.

Facts

Singh was an Indian citizen. He had married a British citizen, and the two had resided for a time in Germany before returning to live in the UK. After they returned to the UK the couple divorced, leading to the UK government cancelling his leave to remain. He stayed and eventually the UK government began procedures to remove him from the UK. Singh then took the case to the European Court of Justice citing EU free movement rules. Under EU law [today, Art 3(1) of the Citizens' Rights Directive], a Union citizen has the right to move to a Member State other than that of his nationality, and has the right to bring certain family members, including his non-EU national spouse, with him when he does so.

Judgment

It was held that EU free movement rules overrode domestic legislation and as such Singh was entitled to remain in the UK.

Significance
This case established a precedent for British citizens to secure UK immigration rights for their non-European spouses, who are unable to join their partners because of several changes in UK immigration law aimed at reducing net migration. Through EU Regulations on Free Movement of Peoples, it provides a window of opportunity to reunite UK citizens with their spouses in the increasing number of cases where the new rules on income and other additional measures mean that such spouses of UK citizens would otherwise be separated by the requirements of increasingly strict visa controls.

The Surinder Singh route involves living and working elsewhere in the European Economic Area for a period of three or more months (there is no actual time period required by EU law but instead it is based on previous case law and its application) and then asserting the rights associated with EEA citizenship and free movement to gain access to their own country while being covered by European law.

In so doing, the Surinder Singh route triggers European rights of free movement that have otherwise been removed from UK citizens by UK legislation.

In principle, the Surinder Singh route applies to all EU citizens, not just UK citizens. For example, a French husband could bring his Mexican wife into France by exercising his treaty rights in Spain. It also applies to qualifying dependent family members as well as spouses.

There are several petitions circulating throughout the UK and to expats abroad that are asking people to fight this recent "government clarification" and an example is 'British people want equal rights to bring their family to the UK ' on government petition website.

The Upper Tribunal of the Asylum and Immigration Tribunal, comprising immigration judges Mr Haddon-Cave J and Mr Kopieczek have since ruled that the Surinder Singh principles apply to unmarried partners (and by analogy, other members of a British returning worker's "extended family"): Kamila Santos Campelo Cain v Secretary of State for the Home Department. (IA/40868/2013).

See also
Directive 2004/38/EC on the right to move and reside freely
Metock case

References

External links
 European nationals and schemes (entry clearance guidance)

Immigration to the United Kingdom
European Union case law
United Kingdom immigration case law
Court of Justice of the European Union case law
1992 in British law